Riabovil, literally Spotted Ox, a Ukrainian surname.

Other spellings
Variations of the surname include Ryabovil, Ryabovol, Riabovol, Riabowol, Rjabovil, Rjabovol. According to the official Ukrainian-English transliteration rules Рябовіл must be spelt as Riabovil.

Derivatives
 Riabovolenko, i.e. Riabovil's son
 Riabovolyk, i.e. Little Riabovil, or Little Spotted Ox
 Riabovoliv, or Riabovolov, i.e. Riabovil's

Famous people
 Mykola Riabovil (1883—1919), the Chairman of the Parliament of Kuban People's Republic (1918—1919)
 Ivan Riabovil, S. Riabovil — pen names of Ivan Bahrianyi (1906—1963), a Ukrainian writer
 Karl Riabowol, a Canadian cancer researcher

References